The 2014–16 European Nations Cup Third Division is the fourth tier of rugby union in Europe behind the Six Nations Championship and the 2014–16 European Nations Cup First Division and the 2014–16 European Nations Cup Second Division.

Slovakia return from the 2012–14 European Nations Cup Third Division, and are joined by the relegated Greece, as well as Belarus, Estonia and Montenegro. 2012–14 champions, Turkey are promoted to ENC 2D, while Azerbaijan have decided not to compete in this tournament.

Belarus played their first international rugby union match; a qualifier against Estonia, who will also be playing in their first ENC tournament. The winner of this match (Estonia) played in a semi final-final format tournament against Montenegro and Slovakia 2014–2015 title. Greece withdrew from the tournament, and was replaced by a Montenegrin President's XV. The format for the 2015–2016 tournament has yet to be decided.

The best team over the 2014–15 and 2015–16 championships will be promoted to Division 2D of the European Nations Cup for the 2016–2018 cup.

Slovakia won the third Division in 2015 by beating Montenegro in the final 31–3. Estonia  won the title in 2016 by beating Slovakia in the final 36–29.

2014–15

Qualifying play-off

Finals
The original format included top seeds Greece, second seeds Slovakia, third seeds and hosts Montenegro and qualifiers Estonia.  Greece were drawn against Estonia, and Slovakia against Montenegro.  However, after the withdrawal of Greece, all teams moved up one seed, with the Montenegrin President's XV taking Greece's place as fourth seed.

Semi-finals

3rd Place Play-Off

Final

2015–16

Finals

Semi-finals

3rd Place Play-Off

Final

See also
 European Nations Cup
 2014–16 European Nations Cup First Division
 2014–16 European Nations Cup Second Division

References

2014–16
2014–15 in European rugby union
2015–16 in European rugby union
European Nations Cup Third Division
European Nations Cup Third Division
European Nations Cup Third Division